A goldsmith is a metalworker who specializes in working with gold and other precious metals. Nowadays they mainly specialize in jewelry-making but historically, goldsmiths have also made silverware, platters, goblets, decorative and serviceable utensils, and ceremonial or religious items.

Goldsmiths must be skilled in forming metal through filing, soldering, sawing, forging, casting, and polishing. The trade has very often included jewelry-making skills, as well as the very similar skills of the silversmith. Traditionally, these skills had been passed along through apprenticeships; more recently jewelry arts schools, specializing in teaching goldsmithing and a multitude of skills falling under the jewelry arts umbrella, are available. Many universities and junior colleges also offer goldsmithing, silversmithing, and metal arts fabrication as a part of their fine arts curriculum.

Gold 

Compared to other metals, gold is malleable, ductile, rare, and it is the only solid metallic element with a yellow color. It may easily be melted, fused, and cast without the problems of oxides and gas that are problematic with other metals such as bronzes, for example. It is fairly easy to "pressure weld", wherein, similarly to clay, two small pieces may be pounded together to make one larger piece. Gold is classified as a noble metal—because it does not react with most elements. It usually is found in its native form, lasting indefinitely without oxidization and tarnishing.

History 

Gold has been worked by humans in all cultures where the metal is available, either indigenously or imported, and the history of these activities is extensive. Superbly made objects from the ancient cultures of Africa, Asia, Europe, India, North America, Mesoamerica, and South America grace museums and collections throughout the world. The Copper Age Varna culture (Bulgaria) from the 5th millennium BC is credited with inventing goldsmith (gold metallurgy). The associated Varna Necropolis treasure contains the oldest golden jewellery in the world with an approximate age of over 6,000 years.

Some pieces date back thousands of years and were made using many techniques that still are used by modern goldsmiths. Techniques developed by some of those goldsmiths achieved a skill level that was lost and remained beyond the skills of those who followed, even to modern times. Researchers attempting to uncover the chemical techniques used by ancient artisans have remarked that their findings confirm that "the high level of competence reached by the artists and craftsmen of these ancient periods who produced objects of an artistic quality that could not be bettered in ancient times and has not yet been reached in modern ones."

In medieval Europe goldsmiths were organized into guilds and usually were one of the most important and wealthiest of the guilds in a city. The guild kept records of members and the marks they used on their products. These records, when they survive, are very useful to historians. Goldsmiths often acted as bankers, since they dealt in gold and had sufficient security for the safe storage of valuable items, though they were usually restrained from lending at interest, which was regarded as usury. In the Middle Ages, goldsmithing normally included silversmithing as well, but the brass workers and workers in other base metals normally were members of a separate guild, since the trades were not allowed to overlap. Many jewelers also were goldsmiths.

The Sunar caste is one of the oldest communities in goldsmithing in India, whose superb gold artworks were displayed at The Great Exhibition of 1851 in London. In India, 'Daivadnya Brahmins',Vishwakarma (Viswabrahmins,Acharis)'Sunar' are the goldsmith castes.

The printmaking technique of engraving developed among goldsmiths in Germany around 1430, who had long used the technique on their metal pieces. The notable engravers of the fifteenth century were either goldsmiths, such as Master E. S., or the sons of goldsmiths, such as Martin Schongauer and Albrecht Dürer.

Contemporary goldsmithing 

A goldsmith might have a wide array of skills and knowledge at their disposal. Gold, being the most malleable metal of all, offers unique opportunities for the worker. In today's world a wide variety of other metals, especially platinum alloys, also may be used frequently. 24 karat is pure gold and historically, was known as fine gold.

Because it is so soft, however, 24 karat gold is rarely used. It is usually alloyed to make it stronger and to create different colors. Depending on the metals used to create the alloy, the color can change.

The goldsmith will use a variety of tools and machinery, including the rolling mill, the drawplate, and perhaps, swage blocks and other forming tools to make the metal into shapes needed to build the intended piece. Then parts are fabricated through a wide variety of processes and assembled by soldering. It is a testament to the history and evolution of the trade that those skills have reached an extremely high level of attainment and skill over time. A fine goldsmith can and will work to a tolerance approaching that of precision machinery, but largely using only his eyes and hand tools. Quite often the goldsmith's job involves the making of mountings for gemstones, in which case they often are referred to as jewelers.

'Jeweller', however, is a term mostly reserved for a person who deals in jewellery (buys and sells) and not to be confused with a goldsmith, silversmith, gemologist, diamond cutter, and diamond setters. A 'jobbing jeweller' is the term for a jeweller who undertakes a small basic amount of jewellery repair and alteration.

Notable goldsmiths

Historical 

 Kalogjera family
 Benvenuto Cellini
 House of Fabergé
 Lorenzo Ghiberti
 Johannes Gutenberg
 George Heriot
 Gaspard van der Heyden
 Paul de Lamerie
 Arnold Lulls
 Jean-Valentin Morel
 Paul Storr
 Adrien Vachette

Contemporary 
 Lois Betteridge
 Jocelyn Burton
 Andrea Cagnetti – Akelo
 Cartier
 William Claude Harper
 Mary Lee Hu
 Linda MacNeil
 Mazlo
 John Paul Miller (1918–2013)
 Gary Noffke
 Christoph Steidl Porenta

Gallery

See also 
 Bench jeweler
 Jewelers' Row
 Old master print, engraving, and niello – goldsmith's techniques or related trades in the Middle Ages
 Persian-Sassanide art patterns
 Household silver
 Sunar
 Toreutics

References

External links 
 

History of banking
Jewellery making
 
Metalworking occupations